Jaintipur is a village panchayat in the Amritsar district of the  Indian state of Punjab.
Locality Name : Jaintipur (	ਜੈਂਤੀਪੂਰ ) 
Tehsil Name : Majitha-3

District : Amritsar 

State : Punjab 

Language : Punjabi and Hindi, English & Urdu 

Time zone: IST (UTC+5:30) 

Elevation / Altitude: 237 meters. Above Sea level 

Telephone Code / Std Code: 0183

References 
 Map of Jaintipur - Jaintipur City Map - City India
Jaintipur is A developed city.

Jaintipur